The FAI Cup 2009 was the 89th season of the national football competition of the Republic of Ireland. It began on the weekend ending 26 April 2009 and ended on 22 November 2009 with the final taking place for the first time at Tallaght Stadium. The winner - Sporting Fingal - earned spots in both the second qualifying round of the 2010–11 UEFA Europa League and the 2010 Setanta Sports Cup.

First round

The first round matches were played on the weekend ending 26 April 2009.

First Round Replays

The matches were played on the weekend ending 3 May 2009.

Second round

The matches were played on the weekend ending 24 May 2009.

Second round replay

The match was played on 31 May 2009.

Third round

The matches were played between 9 and 14 June 2009.

Third round replays

The matches were played between 15 and 17 June 2009.

Fourth round

The matches were played the weekend ending 16 August 2009.

Fourth Round Replays

The matches were played between 18 August and 7 September 2009.

Quarter finals

The matches were played between 11–12 September 2009.

Quarter Final Replays

The matches were played on Tuesday 15 September 2009.

Semi finals
The semi-final draw took place on Monday, 21 September.

Final

References

External links
 Official website
 Results on rte.ie

 
2009
2